Nikishin is a Russian masculine surname, its feminine counterpart is Nikishina. It may refer to

Bohdan Nikishyn (born 1980), Ukrainian fencer
Evgenii Nikishin (1945–1986), Russian mathematician
Svetlana Nikishina (born 1958), Russian volleyball player
Viktoria Nikishina (born 1984), Russian foil fencer
Yevgeni Nikishin (1904–1965), Russian football player

Russian-language surnames